The following is a list of compression formats and related codecs.

Audio compression formats

Non-compression
 Linear pulse-code modulation (LPCM, generally only described as PCM) is the format for uncompressed audio in media files and it is also the standard for CD-DA; note that in computers, LPCM is usually stored in container formats such as WAV, AIFF, or AU, or as raw audio format, although not technically necessary.
 FFmpeg
 Pulse-density modulation (PDM)
 Direct Stream Digital (DSD) is standard for Super Audio CD
 foobar2000 Super Audio CD Decoder (based on MPEG-4 DST reference decoder)
 FFmpeg (based on dsd2pcm)
 Pulse-amplitude modulation (PAM)

Lossless compression

 Actively used
 Most popular
 Free Lossless Audio Codec (FLAC)
 libFLAC
 FFmpeg
 Apple Lossless Audio Codec (ALAC)
 Apple QuickTime
 libalac
 FFmpeg
 Apple Music
 Monkey's Audio (APE)
 Monkey's Audio SDK
 FFmpeg (decoder only)
 OptimFROG (OFR)
 Tom's verlustfreier Audiokompressor (TAK)
 TAK SDK
 FFmpeg (decoder only)
 WavPack (WV)
 libwavpack
 FFmpeg
 True Audio (TTA)
 libtta
 FFmpeg
 Windows Media Audio Lossless (WMAL)
 Windows Media Encoder
 FFmpeg (decoder only)
 Other
 DTS-HD Master Audio, also known as DTS++ and DCA XLL
 libdca (decoder only)
 FFmpeg (decoder only)
 Dolby TrueHD Standard for DVD-Audio in Blu-ray (mathematically based on MLP)
 FFmpeg
 Meridian Lossless Packing (MLP), also known as Packed PCM (PPCM) Standard for DVD-Audio in DVD
 FFmpeg
 MPEG-4 Audio Lossless Coding (MPEG-4 ALS)
 SSC, DST, ALS and SLS reference software (ISO/IEC 14496-5:2001/Amd.10:2007)
 FFmpeg (decoding only)
 MPEG-4 Scalable Lossless Coding (MPEG-4 SLS) Parts of it are used in HD-AAC.
 SSC, DST, ALS and SLS reference software (ISO/IEC 14496-5:2001/Amd.10:2007)
 RealAudio Lossless
 RealPlayer
 FFmpeg (decoding only)
 BFDLAC (BFD Lossless Audio Compression). Ongoing development.
 FXpansion's BFD3 drum software. (2013-2017)
 Oddball
 ATRAC Advanced Lossless (AAL) Extremely unpopular
 FFmpeg (lossy decoder only)
 Direct Stream Transfer (DST) - Only used for Direct Stream Digital
 SSC, DST, ALS and SLS reference software (ISO/IEC 14496-5:2001/Amd.10:2007)
 FFmpeg (decoder only)
 Original Sound Quality (OSQ) - Only used in WaveLab
 Discontinued
 Lossless Audio (LA) – No update for 10+ years
 Shorten (SHN) – Officially discontinued.
 libshn
 FFmpeg (decoding only)
 Lossless Predictive Audio Compression (LPAC) – Predecessor of MPEG-4 ALS
 Lossless Transform Audio Compression (LTAC) – Predecessor of LPAC
 MPEG-1 Audio Layer III HD (mp3HD) – Officially discontinued
 RK Audio (RKAU) – Officially discontinued

Bluetooth lossless 
Doesn't exist.

Lossy compression

 Discrete cosine transform (DCT)
 Modified discrete cosine transform (MDCT, used in most of the audio codecs listed below)

General/Speech hybrid
 Unified Speech and Audio Coding (USAC, MPEG-D Part 3, ISO/IEC 23003-3)
 exhale (encoder only; open source)
 IETF standards:
 Opus (RFC 6716) based on SILK vocoder and CELT codec
 libopus
 FFmpeg (decoding and experimental encoding)
 IETF Internet Draft
 IPMR Speech Codec - used in Spirit DSP's TeamSpirit Voice&Video Engine

Neural audio codecs
 Lyra (codec) - used in Google Duo
 Lyra V2 - based on SoundStream neural codec
 Satin (used by Microsoft Teams)
 Facebook EnCodec

General
 Adaptive differential pulse-code modulation (ADPCM, also called adaptive delta pulse-code modulation)
 Adaptive Transform Acoustic Coding (ATRAC, used in MiniDisc devices)
 FFmpeg (decoder only)
 ATSC/ETSI standards:
 Dolby Digital (AC3, ATSC A/52, ETSI TS 102 366)
 FFmpeg
 liba52 (decoder only)
 Dolby Digital Plus (E-AC-3, ATSC A/52:2012 Annex E, ETSI TS 102 366 Annex E)
 FFmpeg
 DTS Coherent Acoustics (DTS, Digital Theatre System Coherent Acoustics, ETSI TS 102 114) 
 FFmpeg
 libdca (decoder only)
 Dolby AC-4 (ETSI TS 103 190)
 Impala Blackbird audio codec
 ITU standards:
 G.719
 G.722
 FFmpeg
 G.722.1 (subset of Siren7) and G.722.1 Annex C (subset of Siren14)
 libg722_1
 libsiren (part of libmsn and msn-pecan)
 G.722.2
 3GPP TS 26.173 AMR-WB speech Codec (C-source code) reference implementation
 opencore-amr (decoder)
 VisualOn AMR-WB encoder
 FFmpeg (decoding only)
 EVS
 MPEG-1 Audio and MPEG-2 Audio
 layer I (MP1) (MPEG-1, MPEG-2 and non-ISO MPEG-2.5)
 FFmpeg (decoder only)
 layer II (MP2) (MPEG-1, MPEG-2 and non-ISO MPEG-2.5)
 FFmpeg
 tooLame (encoding only)
 twoLame (encoding only)
 layer III (MP3) (MPEG-1, MPEG-2 and non-ISO MPEG-2.5)
 FFmpeg (decoding only)
 LAME (encoding only)
 Advanced Audio Coding (AAC) (MPEG-2 Part 7)
 FAAC (encoder) and FAAD (decoder)
 FFmpeg
 iTunes
 Nero AAC Codec
 VisualOn AAC Encoder (a.k.a. libvo_aacenc)
 Fraunhofer FDK AAC
 libaacplus
 MPEG-4 Audio
 Advanced Audio Coding (AAC, MPEG-4 Part 3 subpart 4), HE-AAC and AAC-LD
 FAAC, FAAD2
 FFmpeg
 iTunes
 Nero AAC Codec
 MPEG-4 AAC reference software (ISO/IEC 14496-5:2001)
 Harmonic and Individual Lines and Noise (HILN, MPEG-4 Parametric Audio Coding)
 MPEG-4 reference software (ISO/IEC 14496-5:2001)
 TwinVQ
 MPEG-4 reference software (ISO/IEC 14496-5:2001)
 FFmpeg (decoding only)
 BSAC (Bit-Sliced Arithmetic Coding)
 MPEG-4 reference software (ISO/IEC 14496-5:2001)
 MPEG-H
 MPEG-H 3D Audio
 Musepack (a.k.a. MPEGplus)
 Musepack SV8 Tools
 FFmpeg (decoding only)
NICAM
 AT&T Perceptual Audio Coder
 Precision Adaptive Subband Coding (PASC; a variant of MP1; used in Digital Compact Cassette)
 QDesign (purchased by DTS)
 QDesign Music Codec used in Apple QuickTime
 FFmpeg (decoding only)
 PictureTel (purchased by Polycom)
 Siren 7
 libg722_1
 libsiren (part of libmsn and msn-pecan)
 FFmpeg (decoder only)
 Siren 14
 libg722_1
 vgmstream (decoder only)
 Siren 22
 NTT TwinVQ
 FFmpeg (decoder only)
 NTT TwinVQ Encoder, NTT TwinVQ Player
 Voxware MetaSound (a variant of NTT TwinVQ)
 Windows Media Player (voxmsdec.ax)
 FFmpeg (decoder only)
 Vorbis
 aoTuV
 FFmpeg
 libvorbis
 Tremor (decoder only)
 Windows Media Audio (WMA)
 Windows Media Encoder
 FFmpeg

AES3 
 SMPTE 302M
 FFmpeg (decoder only)
 Dolby E
 FFmpeg (decoder only)

Bluetooth
 Bluetooth Special Interest Group
 Low Complexity Subband Coding (SBC)
 BlueZ's SBC library (libsbc)
 Fluoride Bluetooth stack (successor of BlueDroid)
 FFmpeg
 CVSD 8 kHz - used in Hands-Free Profile (HFP)
 modified SBC (mSBC) - used in Hands-Free Profile (HFP)
 BlueZ's SBC library (libsbc)
 Fluoride Bluetooth stack
 FFmpeg
 SBC XQ
 PulseAudio's bluetooth stack (encoder only)
 PipeWire's bluetooth stack (encoder only)
 LC3 (Low Complexity Communication Codec)
 ETSI
 LC3plus (ETSI TS 103 634)
 Qualcomm Technologies International (formerly CSR)
 aptX (a.k.a. apt-X)
 Qualcomm libaptX
 FFmpeg
 aptX HD
 Qualcomm libaptXHD
 FFmpeg
 aptX Low Latency
 aptX Adaptive
 FastStream - a variant of SBC codec for bi-directional audio transmission
 Sony
 LDAC
 libldac (encoder only) - used in Android Oreo
 libldacdec (decoder only)
 HWA Alliance/Savitech
 LHDC
 HWA encoder/decoder
 LLAC
HWA encoder/decoder
 HiBy
 Ultra Audio Transmission (UAT)
 Samsung
 Samsung HD/UHQ-BT codec
 Samsung Scalable codec
 Samsung Seamless codec

Digital radio
 Hybrid Digital Coding - used in HD Radio (a.k.a. NRSC-5)
 NRSC-5 receiver for rtl-sdr (decoder only)

Voice

(low bit rate, optimized for speech)
 Linear predictive coding (LPC, used in most of the speech codecs listed below)
 Code-excited linear prediction (CELP)
 Algebraic code-excited linear prediction (ACELP)
 Xiph.Org Foundation
 Speex, patent free
 libspeex
 FFmpeg (decoder only)
 Dialogic ADPCM (VOX)
 FFmpeg (decoder only)
 ITU standards:
 G.711 (a-law and μ-law companding; 64kbit/s), also known as PCM of voice frequencies
 Sun Microsystems's public domain implementation
 FFmpeg (libavcodec)
 G.711.0 (G.711 LLC)
 G.711.1 (Wideband extension for G.711; 64/80/96kbit/s)
 G.711.1D (Super-wideband extension for G.711.1; 96/112/128kbit/s)
 G.718 (8/12/16/24/32kbit/s)
 G.718B (Super-wideband extension for G.718; 28–48kbit/s)
 G.719
 G.721 (superseded by G.726; 32kbit/s)
 Sun Microsystems's public domain implementation
 G.722 (SB-ADPCM; 48/56/64kbit/s)
 FFmpeg
 G.722B (Super-wideband extension for G.722; 64/80/96kbit/s)
 G.722.2 (AMR-WB)
 3GPP TS 26.173 AMR-WB speech Codec (C-source code) reference implementation
 opencore-amr (decoder)
 FFmpeg (decoder only)
 G.723 (24 and 40 kbit/s DPCM, extension to G.721, superseded by G.726)
 Sun Microsystems's public domain implementation
 G.723.1 (MPC-MLQ or ACELP; 5.3/6.3kbit/s)
 FFmpeg
 G.726 (ADPCM; 16/24/32/40kbit/s)
 Sun Microsystems's public domain implementation
 FFmpeg (libavcodec)
 G.727
 Sun Microsystems's public domain implementation
 G.728 (LD-CELP; 16kbit/s)
 G.729 (CS-ACELP; 8kbit/s)
 FFmpeg (decoder only)
 G.729a
 G.729b
 G.729ab
 G.729d (6.4kbit/s)
 FFmpeg (decoder only)
 G.729e (11.8kbit/s)
 G.729.1 (G.729 Annex J; Wideband extension for G.711; 8–32kbit/s)
 G.729.1E (Super-wideband extension for G.729.1)
 Google
 internet Speech Audio Codec (iSAC)
 WebRTC
 Nellymoser Asao Codec
 FFmpeg (libavcodec)
 PictureTel PT716, PT716plus
 PictureTel PT724
 RTAudio used by Microsoft Live Communication Server
 SVOPC used by Skype
 OpenLPC created by Future Dynamics
 HawkVoice (libHVDI)
 ANSI/SCTE
 ANSI/SCTE 24-21 2006 (BroadVoice16)
 BroadVoice Speech Codec Open Source C Code
 ANSI/SCTE 24-22 2013 (iLBCv2.0)
 ANSI/SCTE 24-23 2007 (BroadVoice32)
 BroadVoice Speech Codec Open Source C Code
 IETF RFCs:
 Internet Low Bit Rate Codec (iLBC, RFC 3951) developed by Global IP Solutions/Google
 WebRTC
 IETF Internet Draft
 SILK (used by Skype)
 CELT (developed by Xiph.Org Foundation)
 libcelt
 MPEG-4 Audio
 MPEG-4 CELP
 MPEG-4 HVXC
 Skyphone MPLP
 Inmarsat
 INMARSAT-M IMBE
 Inmarsat Mini-M AMBE

Microsoft DirectPlay
Those codecs are used by many PC games which use voice chats via Microsoft DirectPlay API.
 Voxware MetaVoice
 Windows Media Player (voxmvdec.ax)
 Truespeech
 Windows Media Player (tssoft32.acm)
 FFmpeg (decoder only)
 MS GSM
 Windows Media Player (msgsm32.acm)
 libgsm
 FFmpeg (decoder only)
 MS-ADPCM
 Windows Media Player (msadp32.acm)
 FFmpeg

Digital Voice Recorder
 International Voice Association (IVA) standards:
 Digital Speech Standard / Standard Play (DSS-SP)
 FFmpeg (decoding only)
 Digital Speech Standard / Quality Play (DSS-QP)
 Sony LPEC
 Truespeech Triple Rate CODER (TRC) used in some pocket recorders
  Intermetall MI-SC4 - used by voice recorders such as RadioShack Digital Recorder and  HyperHyde
 FFmpeg (decoder only)

Mobile phone

Generation 2
 European Telecommunications Standards Institute (ETSI) GSM
 Full Rate (GSM 06.10, RPE-LTP)
 libgsm
 FFmpeg (decoder only)
 Half Rate (GSM 06.20, VSELP 5.6kbit/s)
 Enhanced Full Rate (GSM 06.60, ACELP 12.20kbit/s, compatible with AMR mode AMR_12.20)
 Telecommunications Industry Association (TIA) IS-95 (a.k.a. cdmaOne)
 IS-96A (QCELP 8kbit/s)
 IS-127 (EVRC 8kbit/s)
 IS-733 (QCELP 13kbit/s)
 Telecommunications Industry Association (TIA) IS-54/IS-136 (a.k.a. Digital AMPS)
 IS-85 (VSELP 8kbit/s)
 ITU-T G.191's IS-54 implementation
 IS-641 (ACELP 7.4kbit/s, compatible with AMR mode AMR_7.40)
 Association of Radio Industries and Businesses (ARIB) RCR STD-27 (PDC)
 PDC-HR (PSI-CELP 3.45kbit/s)
 PDC-FR (VSELP 11.2kbit/s)
 PDC-EFR CS-ACELP 8kbit/s (a.k.a. G.729)
 PDC-EFR ACELP 6.7kbit/s (compatible with AMR mode AMR_6.70)

Generation 3/4
 3rd Generation Partnership Project (3GPP)
 Adaptive Multi-Rate (AMR)
 AMR-NB
 3GPP TS 26.073 AMR speech Codec (C-source code) reference implementation
 opencore-amr (one may compile ffmpeg with—enable-libopencore-amrnb to incorporate the OpenCORE lib)
 FFmpeg (by default decoder only, but see above the compiling options to incorporate the OpenCORE lib)
 AMR-WB
 3GPP TS 26.173 AMR-WB speech Codec (C-source code) reference implementation
 opencore-amr (decoder), from OpenCORE (one may compile ffmpeg with—enable-libopencore-amrwb to incorporate the OpenCORE lib)
 vo-amrwbenc (encoder), from VisualOn, included in Android (one may compile ffmpeg with—enable-libvo-amrwbenc to incorporate the VisualOn lib)
 FFmpeg (by default decoder only, but see above the compiling options).
 AMR-WB+
 3GPP TS 26.273 AMR-WB+ speech Codec (C-source code) reference implementation
 Enhanced Voice Services (EVS)
 3GPP TS.26.443 – Codec for Enhanced Voice Services (EVS) – ANSI C code (floating-point)
 3rd Generation Partnership Project 2 (3GPP2)
 Enhanced Variable Rate Codec (EVRC, a.k.a. IS-127) based on RCELP
 FFmpeg (decoder only)
 Enhanced Variable Rate Codec B (EVRC-B)
 QCELP (Qualcomm Code Excited Linear Prediction)
 QCELP-8 (a.k.a. SmartRate or IS-96C)
 FFmpeg (decoder only)
 QCELP-13 (a.k.a. PureVoice or IS-733)
 FFmpeg (decoder only)
 Selectable Mode Vocoder (SMV)
 Variable Multi Rate – WideBand (VMR-WB)

Professional mobile radio
 APCO
 Project 25 Phase 2 Enhanced Full-Rate (AMBE+2 4400bit/s with 2800bit/s FEC)
 Project 25 Phase 2 Half-Rate (AMBE+2 2450bit/s with 1150bit/s FEC) also used in NXDN and DMR
 mbelib (decoder only)
 Project 25 Phase 1 Full Rate (IMBE 7200bit/s)
 mbelib (decoder only)
 European Telecommunications Standards Institute (ETSI)
 ETS 300 395-2 (TETRA ACELP 4.6kbit/s)

 TETRAPOL
 RPCELP 6kbit/s
 D-STAR Digital Voice (AMBE 2400bit/s with 1200bit/s FEC)
 mbelib (decoder only)
 Professional Digital Trunking System Industry Association (PDT Alliance) standards:
 NVOC used in China
 Spirit DSP RALCWI
 DSPINI
 SPR Robust
 TWELP Robust
 Codec2
 libcodec2
 RL-CELP (used in Japanese railways)

Military
 U.S. Department of Defense (DoD) Federal Standard:
 FS-1015 (a.k.a. LPC-10)
 HawkVoice (libHVDI)
 FS-1016 (CELP)
 HawkVoice (libHVDI)
 FS-1023 (CVSD 12kbit/s)
 United States Military Standard (MIL-STD)
 MIL-STD-188 113 (CVSD 16kbit/s and 32kbit/s)
 SoX (libsox)
 MIL-STD-3005 (a.k.a. MELP)
 Texas Instruments' 2.4 kbit/s MELP Proposed Federal Standard speech coder
 NATO
 STANAG 4198 (a.k.a. LPC-10e)
 SpanDSP (open source)
 STANAG-4591 (a.k.a. MELPe)
 Microsoft Speech coder
 BBN NRV developed in DARPA program

Video games 
 Bink Audio, Smacker Audio
 FFmpeg (decoder only)
 Actimagine (Nintendo European Research & Development) FastAudio
 MobiclipDecoder (decoder only)
 FFmpeg (decoder only)
 Nintendo GCADPCM (a.k.a. DSP ADPCM or THP ADPCM) - used in GameCube, Wii and Nintendo 3DS.
 vgmstream (decoder only)
 VGAudio
 FFmpeg (decoder only)
 Sony VAG (a.k.a. Sony PSX ADPCM)
 vgmstream (decoder only)
 FFmpeg (decoder only)
 Sony HEVAG - used in PS Vita.
 vgmstream (decoder only)
 Sony ATRAC9 - used in PS4 and PS Vita.
 VGAudio (decoder only)
 FFmpeg (decoder only)
 Microsoft XMA - WMA variants for Xbox 360 hardware decoding.
 FFmpeg (decoder only)
 Xbox ADPCM
 vgmstream (decoder only)
 CRI ADX ADPCM
 vgmstream (decoder only)
 VGAudio
 FFmpeg
 CRI HCA/HCA-MX - used in CRI ADX2 middleware.
 vgmstream (decoder only)
 VGAudio
 FFmpeg (decoder only)
 libcgss
 HCADecoder (decoder only)
 FMOD FADPCM
 vgmstream (decoder only)

Text compression formats
 BiM
 Continuous Media Markup Language (CMML)
 MPEG-4 Part 17 (e.g. 3GPP Timed Text)
 ttyrec

Video compression formats

Non-compression 
 RGB 4:4:4 (only linear, transfer-converted and bit-reduced also sort of compression up to about 3:1 for HDR)
 YUV 4:4:4/4:2:2/4:1:1/4:2:0 (all lower 4:4:4 is spatially compressed up to 2:1 for 4:2:0 with specific colour distortions).
 Intel IYUV
 10-bit uncompressed video
 Composite digital signal - used by SMPTE D-2 and D-3 broadcast digital videocassettes
 Avid DNxUncompressed
 V210

Analog signals 
 PAL broadcast signal
 Pyctools-PAL (open source)

 NTSC broadcast signal
 gr-ntsc (open source)

 LaserDisc RF signal
 ld-decode (open source)
 VHS / S-VHS / U-Matic RF signal
 VHS-Decode (open source)
 Composite Video Baseband Signal (CVBS)
 VHS-Decode's CVBS-Decode (open source)

Lossless video compression
 ITU-T/ISO/IEC standards:
 H.264 lossless
 x264 (encoder only)
 FFmpeg (decoder only, uses x264 for encoding)
 H.265 lossless
 x265 (encoder only)
 UHDcode (decoder only, uses x265 to read HEVC encoded files)
FFmpeg (decoder only, uses x265 for encoding)
 Motion JPEG 2000 lossless
 libopenjpeg
 JPEG XS lossless
 FastTICO-XS 
 IETF standards:
 FFV1 (RFC 9043)  FFV1's compression factor is comparable to Motion JPEG 2000, but based on quicker algorithms (allows real-time capture). Written by Michael Niedermayer and published as part of FFmpeg under to GNU LGPL.
 FFmpeg
 SMPTE standards:
 VC-2 HQ lossless (a.k.a. Dirac Pro lossless)
 libdirac
 libschroedinger

 Alparysoft Lossless Video Codec (Alpary)
 Apple Animation (QuickTime RLE)
 QuickTime
 FFmpeg
 ArithYuv
 AV1
 libaom
 AVIzlib
 LCL (VfW codec) MSZH and ZLIB
 FFmpeg
 Autodesk Animator Codec (AASC)
 FFmpeg (decoder only)
 CamStudio GZIP/LZO
 FFmpeg (decoder only)
 Chennai Codec (EVX-1)
 Cairo Experimental Video Codec (open source)
 Dxtory
 FFmpeg (decoder only)
 FastCodec
 Flash Screen Video v1/v2
 FFmpeg
 FM Screen Capture Codec
 FFmpeg (decoder only)
 Fraps codec (FPS1)
 FFmpeg (decoder only)
 Grass Valley Lossless
 Grass Valley Codec Option
 FFmpeg (decoder only)
 Huffyuv  Huffyuv (or HuffYUV) was written by Ben Rudiak-Gould and published under the terms of the GNU GPL as free software, meant to replace uncompressed YCbCr as a video capture format.  It uses very little cpu but takes a lot of disk space.  See also ffvhuff which is an "FFmpeg" only version of it.
 FFmpeg
 IgCodec
 Intel RLE
 innoHeim/Rsupport Screen Capture Codec
 FFmpeg (decoder only)
 Lagarith  A more up-to-date fork of Huffyuv is available as Lagarith
 Lagarith Codec (VfW codec)
 FFmpeg (decoder only)
 LOCO - based on JPEG-LS
 FFmpeg (decoder only)
 MagicYUV
 MagicYUV SDK
 FFmpeg (decoder only)
 Microsoft RLE
 MSU Lossless Video Codec
 MSU Screen Capture Lossless
  - based on PNG
 FFmpeg
 ScreenPresso (SPV1)
 FFmpeg (decoder only)
 ScreenPressor - a successor of MSU Screen Capture Lossless
 FFmpeg (decoder only)
 SheerVideo
 FFmpeg (decoder only)
 Snow lossless
 FFmpeg
 TechSmith Screen Capture Codec (TSCC)
 EnSharpen Video Codec for QuickTime
 FFmpeg (decoder only)
 Toponoky
 Ut Video Codec Suite
 libutvideo
 FFmpeg
 VBLE
 FFmpeg (decoder only)
 VMnc VMware screen codec - used by VMware Workstation
 FFmpeg (decoder only)
 VP9 by Google
 libvpx
 FFmpeg (decoder only)
 YULS
 ZeroCodec
 FFmpeg (decoder only)
 ZMBV (Zip Motion Block Video) Codec - used by DOSBox
 FFmpeg

Lossless game codecs 
 DXA
 ScummVM Tools (encoder only)
 FFmpeg (decoder only)

Lossy compression
 Discrete cosine transform (DCT, used in Digital Betacam and most of the video codecs listed below)

General
 ITU-T/ISO/IEC standards:
 H.120
 H.261 (a.k.a. Px64)
 FFmpeg H.261 (libavcodec)
 Microsoft H.263
 MPEG-1 Part 2 (MPEG-1 Video)
 FFmpeg
 MainConcept MPEG-1
 TMPGEnc
 H.262/MPEG-2 Part 2 (MPEG-2 Video)
 Canopus ProCoder
 Cinema Craft Encoder
 FFmpeg
 InterVideo Video Decoder
 MainConcept MPEG-2
 Microsoft H.263
 TMPGEnc
 H.263
 FFmpeg H.263 (libavcodec)
 MPEG-4 Part 2 (MPEG-4 Advanced Simple Profile)
 3ivx
 DivX
 libavcodec
 HDX4
 Nero Digital
 Xvid
 H.264/MPEG-4 AVC or MPEG-4 Part 10 (MPEG-4 Advanced Video Coding), approved for Blu-ray
 CoreAVC (decoder only; limited to below Hi10P profile)
 MainConcept
 Nero Digital
 QuickTime H.264
 Sorenson AVC Pro codec, Sorenson's new implementation
 OpenH264 (baseline profile only)
 x264 (encoder only; supports some of Hi422P and Hi444PP features)
 FFmpeg (decoder only)
 MPEG-4 AVC variants:
 MPEG-4 Web Video Coding or MPEG-4 Part 29 a subset of MPEG-4 AVC baseline profile
 XAVC
 HEVC (High Efficiency Video Coding, H.265, MPEG-H part 2)
 x265 (encoder only)
 Versatile Video Coding (H.266, VVC)
 VVC Test Model (VTM reference software for VVC; open source)
 Fraunhofer Versatile Video Decoder (open source; decoder only)
 Fraunhofer Versatile Video Encoder (open source; encoder only)
 Video Coding for Browsers (VCB)/VP8 (MPEG-4 Part 31, ISO/IEC 14496-31, RFC 6386)
 libvpx
 FFmpeg
Internet Video Coding (ISO/IEC 14496-33, MPEG-4 IVC)
 Essential Video Coding (EVC; MPEG-5 Part 1; under-development)
 LCEVC, MPEG-5 Part 2 (Low Complexity Enhancement Video Coding)
 IETF Internet Draft (NETVC)
 xvc
 Divideon's reference implementation (open source)
 Thor (forms the basis of AV1)
 Cisco's reference implementation (open source)
 SMPTE standards:
 VC-1 (SMPTE 421M, subset of Windows Media Video)
 FFmpeg (decoder only)
 Dirac (SMPTE 2042-1)
 Schrödinger
 dirac-research
 FFmpeg (decoder only)
 Alliance for Open Media
 AV1 (AOMedia Video 1)
 libaom
 SVT-AV1
 rav1e (encoder only)
 dav1d (decoder only)
 libgav1 (decoder only)
 Xiph.Org Foundation
 Daala (under development, basis (alongside other formats) of AV1)
 libdaala (open source)
 Theora (based on VP3)
 FFmpeg (decoding only)
 libtheora (open source)
 Apple Video (Apple RPZA)
 QuickTime
 FFmpeg
 Blackbird FORscene video codec
 Firebird Original FORscene video codec
 Digital Video Interactive standards:
 RTV 2.1 (a.k.a. Indeo 2)
 FFmpeg (decoder only)
 PLV (Production Level Video)
 ActionMedia II driver (decoder only)
 Indeo 3/4/5
 Microsoft Video 1 (MSV1, MS-CRAM, based on MotiVE)
 Open Media Commons standards:
 OMS Video (based on H.261)
 On2 Technologies TrueMotion VP3/VP4, VP5, VP6, VP7; under the name The Duck Corporation: TrueMotion S, TrueMotion 2, TrueMotion RT 2.0
 FFmpeg (decoder only)
 RealVideo 1, G2, 8, 9 and 10
 FFmpeg
 RealMedia HD SDK
 RealVideo Fractal Codec (a.k.a. Iterated Systems ClearVideo)
 FFmpeg (decoder only)
 RealMedia HD (a.k.a. RealVideo 11)
 RealMedia HD SDK
 Snow Wavelet Codec
 Sorenson Video, Sorenson Spark
 FFmpeg
 VP9 by Google; VP10 was not released and instead was integrated into AV1
 libvpx
 FFmpeg
 Windows Media Video (WMV)
 WAX (Part of the Windows Media Series)
 FFmpeg
 Guobiao standards (GB/T)
 Audio Video Standard (AVS)
 AVS1-P2 (GB/T 20090.2-2006) - used in China Blue High-definition Disc.
 FFmpeg (decoding only)
 AVS1-P7 (AVS-M; under-development)
 AVS2-P2 (GB/T 33475.2-2016, IEEE 1857.4 (draft))
 uAVS2 Encoder
 xavs2 (encoder only)
 davs2 (libdavs2; decoder only)
 AVS3-P2 (draft, IEEE1857.10)
 uavs3e (encoder only)
 uavs3d (decoder only)

Scalable
VP8, VP9, AV1, and H.266/VVC support scalable modes by default.

 Scalable Video Coding (H.264/SVC; an extension of H.264/MPEG-4 AVC)
 Scalable High Efficiency Video Coding (SHVC; an extension of H.265/HEVC)

Intra-frame-only
 Motion JPEG
 FFmpeg
 Morgan Multimedia M-JPEG
 Pegasus PICVideo M-JPEG
 MainConcept M-JPEG
 ISO/IEC standard
 Motion JPEG 2000 (ISO/IEC 15444-3, ITU-T T.802)
 libopenjpeg
 FFmpeg
 Morgan Multimedia M-JPEG2000
 Morgan Multimedia dcpPlayer (decoder only)
 JPEG XS (ISO/IEC 21122) Lightweight Low latency video codec
 intoPIX fastTICO-XS
 DV (IEC 61834)
 FFmpeg
 MPEG-4 SStP (ISO/IEC 14496-2)
 FFmpeg
 Motion JPEG XR (ISO/IEC 29199-3, ITU-T T.833)
 Apple ProRes 422/4444
 FFmpeg
 Apple Intermediate Codec
 FFmpeg (decoder only)
 Apple Pixlet
 FFmpeg (decoder only)
 AVC-Intra 
 x264 (encoder only)
 FFmpeg (decoder only)
 AVC-Ultra a subset of MPEG-4 AVC Hi444PP profile
 XAVC-I
 CineForm HD
 CineForm-SDK  developed by GoPro (open source)
 FFmpeg
 SMPTE standard
 VC-2 SMPTE standard (a.k.a. Dirac Pro. SMPTE ST 2042)
 Schrödinger
 dirac-research
 VC-2 Reference Encoder and Decoder  developed by BBC (open source)
 FFmpeg (the encoder only supports VC-2 HQ profile)
 VC-3 SMPTE standard (SMPTE ST 2019)
 Avid DNxHD
 FFmpeg
 VC-5 SMPTE standard (SMPTE ST 2073; a superset of CineForm HD)
 Grass Valley HQ/HQA/HQX
 Grass Valley Codec Option
 FFmpeg (decoder only)
 NewTek NT25
 NewTek SpeedHQ - used in Network Device Interface (NDI) protocol
 NewTek Codec
 FFmpeg

Stereoscopic 3D
 Multiview Video Coding

Security and surveillance cameras 
 Guobiao standards (GB/T)
 AVS-S-P2 (suspended)
 SVAC (GB/T 25724-2010)
 Infinity CCTV Codec (IMM4/IMM5/IMM6)
 FFmpeg (IMM4 and IMM5 decoder only)

CD-ROM or CD-related video codecs 
 CDXL codec
 FFmpeg (decoder only)
 Cinepak (a.k.a. Apple Compact Video)
 FFmpeg
 Photo CD codec
 FFmpeg (decoder only)
 MotionPixels - used in MovieCD
 FFmpeg (decoder only)
 CD+G (CD+Graphics) codec
 FFmpeg (decoder only)
 VLC (decoder only)
 CD+EG (CD+Extended Graphics) codec

Network video codecs 
 SMPTE RDD
 LLVC (Low Latency Video Codec; SMPTE RDD 34) - used in Networked Media Interface (NMI; SMPTE RDD 40)
 HEVC-SCC (Screen Content Coding Extensions)
 ZRLE (RFC 6143 7.7.6) - used by VNC
 Sun Microsystems's CellB video (RTP playload type 25)  - used in Solaris's SunVideo Plus and Lawrence Berkeley National Laboratory's vic (Video Conferencing Tool)
 Xerox PARC's Network Video (nv; RTP playload type 28)  - used in Xerox's nv and Lawrence Berkeley National Laboratory's vic (Video Conferencing Tool)
 CU-SeeMe video codec
 GoToMeeting codec
 FFmpeg (decoder only)

Bayer video codecs 
 CinemaDNG (created by Adobe; used in Blackmagic cameras)
 Redcode RAW (used in RED cameras) a modified version of JPEG 2000
 libredcode
 ArriRaw (used in Arri cameras)
 Cineform RAW (used in Silicon Imaging cameras)
 CineForm-SDK
 Blackmagic RAW (used in Blackmagic cameras)
 Blackmagic RAW SDK
 Cintel RAW (used in Cintel Scanner)
 FFmpeg (decoder only)
 Apple ProRes RAW
 intoPIX TICO RAW
 intoPIX fastTICO-RAW SDK & TICO-RAW FPGA/ASIC libraries
 Canon CRX - used in Canon Cinema Raw Light movie
 Canon RAW Plugin for Avid Media Access
 LibRaw (decoder only; open source)

Video games
 Bink Video, Smacker video
 FFmpeg
 libavcodec
 Nintendo Mobiclip video codec
 FFmpeg (decoder only)
 CRI Sofdec codec - a MPEG variant with 11-bit DC and color space correction; used in Sofdec middleware
 CRI P256 - used in Sofdec middleware for Nintendo DS
 Indeo Video Interactive (aka Indeo 4/5) - used in PC games for Microsoft Windows
 FFmpeg (decoder only)
 Intel Indeo Video

Real-time
 Hap/Hap Alpha/Hap Q
 VIDVOX hap codec
 FFmpeg
 DXV Codec
 Resolume DXV Codec
 FFmpeg (decoder only)
 NotchLC
 FFmpeg (decoder only)
 VESA Display Stream Compression (DSC)
 VESA Display Compression-M (VDC-M)

See also

 List of open-source codecs
 Comparison of video codecs
 Comparison of audio coding formats
 Comparison of video container formats
 Comparison of graphics file formats
 Comparison of video player software
 RTP payload formats

References

 
Codecs

tr:Çözücü listesi